In April 1961, Sierra Leone became politically independent of Great Britain. It retained a parliamentary system of government and was a member of the British Commonwealth of Nations. The Sierra Leone People's Party (SLPP), led by Sir Milton Margai were victorious in the first general election under universal adult franchise in May 1962. Upon Sir Milton's death in 1964, his half-brother, Sir Albert Margai, succeeded him as Prime Minister. Sir Albert attempted to establish a one-party state had the ready cooperation of the opposition All People' Congress  but met fierce resistance from some cadre  within his party Sierra Leone People's Party (SLPP) and ultimately abandoned the idea.

In closely contested elections in March 1967, the APC won a plurality of the parliamentary seats. Accordingly, the Governor General (representing the British Monarch) Henry Josiah Lightfoot Boston declared Siaka Stevens – APC leader and Mayor of Freetown – as the new Prime Minister. Within a few hours, Stevens and Lightfoot-Boston were placed under house arrest by Brigadier David Lansana, the Commander of the Sierra Leone Military Forces (SLMF), on grounds that the determination of office should await the election of the tribal representatives to the house. A group of senior military officers overrode this action by seizing control of the government on 23 March, arresting Brigadier Lansana, and suspending the constitution. The group constituted itself as the National Reformation Council (NRC) with Brigadier Andrew Juxon-Smith as its chairman. The NRC in turn was overthrown in April 1968 by a "sergeants' revolt," the Anti-Corruption Revolutionary Movement. NRC members were imprisoned, army and police officers were deposed, the democratic constitution was restored, and power was handed back to Stevens, who at last assumed the office of Prime Minister.

After the return to civilian rule by-elections were held beginning in the fall of 1968 and an all-APC cabinet was appointed. Tranquility was not completely restored: in November 1968 a state of emergency was declared after provincial disturbances, and in March 1971 the government survived an unsuccessful military coup. In April 1971 a republican constitution was adopted under which Stevens became President. In 1972 by-elections the opposition SLPP complained of intimidation and procedural obstruction by the APC and militia. These problems became so severe that it boycotted the 1973 general election; as a result the APC won 84 of the 85 elected seats. In July 1974, the government uncovered an alleged military coup plot. As in 1971, the leaders were tried and executed. In 1977, student demonstrations against the government disrupted Sierra Leone politics. A general election was called later that year in which corruption was again endemic; the APC won 74 seats and the SLPP 15.

An independent nation led by Sir Milton Margai

On 27 April 1961, Milton Margai led Sierra Leone to independence from the United Kingdom. Thousands of Sierra Leoneans across the nation took to the streets to celebrate their independence. The nation held its first general elections on 27 May 1962, and Margai was elected Sierra Leone's first prime minister by a landslide. Milton Margai's political party, the Sierra Leone People's Party (SLPP), won by large margins in the nation's first general election under universal adult suffrage in May 1962. 

An important aspect of Margai's character was his self-effacement. He was neither corrupt nor did he make a lavish display of his power or status. Sir Milton's government was based on the rule of law and the notion of separation of powers, with multiparty political institutions and fairly viable representative structures. Margai used his conservative ideology to lead Sierra Leone without much strife. He appointed government officials with a clear eye to satisfy various ethnic groups.  Margai successfully built coalitions from in the 1950s to attain independence without bloodshed. With his genteel nature, Margai employed a brokerage style of politics by sharing political power between political groups and the paramount chiefs in the provinces.

Upon Margai's death on 28 April 1964, an internal crisis within members of the Sierra Leone People's party erupted as to who would succeed Margai as Prime Minister. The parliament of Sierra Leone held an emergency session to elect a new prime minister; the person must be a member of the ruling SLPP party. One of the two leading candidates to succeed  Margai as prime minister was Sir Albert Margai, Sierra Leone's Finance Minister and also the younger brother of Sir Milton Margai. The other was Dr. John Karefa-Smart, Sierra Leone's foreign minister and a close ally of Sir Milton. Sir Albert Margai was elected by a majority vote in Parliament to be the new leader of the SLPP and the next prime minister of Sierra Leone. Sir Albert Margai's leadership was briefly challenged by Sierra Leone's Foreign Minister John Karefa-Smart, an ethnic Sherbro, who questioned Sir Albert's succession to the SLPP leadership position. Kareefa-Smart received little support in Parliament in his attempt to have Margai stripped of the SLPP leadership.

Albert Margai Administration

Sir Albert was sworn in as Sierra Leone's second Prime Minister the same day his brother died at a ceremony held at the Sierra Leone's parliament in Freetown. Soon after Margai was sworn in as Prime Minister, he immediately dismissed Karefa-Smart and several other senior government officials who had served under his elder brother Sir Milton's government, as he viewed them as traitors and a threat to his administration. Sir Albert appointed the Creole politician Cyril B. Rogers-Wright to replace Karefa-Smart.

Unlike his late brother Milton, Sir Albert was opposed to the colonial legacy of allowing the country's Paramount Chiefs executive powers and he was seen as a threat to the existence of the ruling houses across the country. This made him unpopular with the powerful paramount chiefs, most of whom were founding members of the SLPP. To strengthen support for his reform agenda for the party and the country the new Prime Minister brought into the executive of the SLPP and his government younger, western-educated, and more radicalised members of the party including Salia Jusu Sheriff (PhD). The party was thus divided with the traditionalist and more powerful old guard against the new and younger leaders. As Prime Minister Sir Albert Margai opposed Creole domination of the civil service and many ethnic Creoles lost their positions in the civil service as a result. Sir Albert Margai was highly criticized during his tenure as prime minister.  He was accused of corruption and of a policy of affirmative action in favor of the Mende ethnic group. During Albert Margai's administration, The Mende increased their influence both in the civil service and the army. Most of the top military and government positions were held by Mendes. Sir Albert also tried to establish a one-party state but with very little support in Parliament, even among his fellow SLPP members and was also met by fierce resistance from the main opposition the All People's Congress (APC), which had become suddenly more popular than the ruling SLPP and ultimately abandoned the idea. 

Under Albert Margai's government, Sierra Leone enjoyed freedom of speech and freedom of the press. Sir Albert tolerated criticism of his government, even by his political opponent. Not a single journalist or politician was killed during his term in office. Sir Albert tolerated criticism or written a libel claim against his government. Under Albert Margai, all Sierra Leoneans had equal access to free and fair trial. Sir Albert had the opportunity to perpetuate himself in power, but he elected not to do so even when the opportunities presented themselves. He had the police and the army on his side and nothing could have prevented him from achieving his ambition to hold on to power, but he chose not to and called for a free and fair elections.

Three military coups, 1967-1968

After the closely contested general election in March 1967, Sierra Leone Governor General Sir Henry Josiah Lightfoot Boston declared the new prime minister to be Siaka Stevens, an ethnic Limba, the candidate of the APC and the mayor of Freetown.  Stevens had defeated the incumbent prime minister, Sir Albert Margai, by a narrow margin. Stevens won the majority of the vote in the north of the country and in the western area, including in Freetown. Albert Margai on the other side, won the vast majority of the vote in south-eastern Sierra Leone. Sir Albert conceded defeat and handed power to Siaka Stevens. Stevens was sworn in as Sierra Leone's third prime minister on 21 March 1967 in Freetown. Mere hours after he took office, soldiers stormed the State House and abducted Stevens at gunpoint. The coup was led by Brigadier General David Lansana, an ethnic Mende and the commander of the Sierra Leone Armed Forces. Brigadier Lansana was a prominent supporter of Albert Margai, who had appointed him to the top command in 1964. Brigadier Lansana declared a state of emergency and imposed martial law. He insisted that the determination of the winner of the election should await the election of the tribal representatives in Parliament, mostly from Mende chiefdoms in South-Eastern Sierra Leone.

On 23 March 1967, however, a group of senior army officers led by Brigadier Andrew Juxon-Smith, an ethnic Creole, in turn seized control of the government, arrested Lansana and suspended the constitution.  Martial law was maintained. The group constituted itself as the National Reformation Council (NRC) with Brigadier Andrew Juxon-Smith as its chairman. On 18 April 1968, the NRC was in turn overthrown by a third group of senior army, who called themselves the Anti-Corruption Revolutionary Movement (ACRM), led by Brigadier General John Amadu Bangura, an ethnic Limba. The ACRM imprisoned Brigadier Andrew Juxon-Smith and other senior NRC members and restored the constitution. In Brigadier Bangura's  first speech, he urged Sierra Leoneans to stay calm and appealed to the military to respect the constitution and stay out of politics. Bangura invited Stevens to the state house and reinstated him as prime minister in a special ceremony. Brigadier Bangura was accused of tribalism in favor of Siaka Stevens.

Stevens government and one-party state

Stevens assumed power again in 1968 with a great deal of promise and ambition. Much trust was placed upon him as he championed multi-party politics. Upon taking power from the military, however, he drove the SLPP from competitive politics in general elections using violence and intimidation. To gain support of the military, Stevens retained the popular John Amadu Bangura as the head of the Sierra Leone Armed Forces.

After the return to civilian rule, by-elections were held (beginning in autumn 1968) and an all-APC cabinet was appointed. Calm was not completely restored. In November 1968, Stevens declared a state of emergency after disturbance in the provinces.

Stevens had campaigned on a platform of socialist principles. However, when he became Prime Minister he abandoned his pre-election promises and employed an authoritarian model of governance.

Many senior officers in the Sierra Leone military were disappointed but none could confront Stevens. Brigadier General Bangura, who had reinstated Stevens as Prime Minister, was widely considered the only person who could put the brakes on Stevens. Bangura was a magnetic and popular figure among Sierra Leoneans. The army was devoted to him and this made him potentially dangerous to Steven's new agenda in the shifting political climate of Sierra Leone. In January 1970, Bangura was arrested and charged with conspiracy and plotting to commit a coup against the Stevens government. He was convicted and sentenced to death by execution. On 29 March 1970, Bangura was hanged at the Kissy Road in central Freetown. In March 1971, a group of senior military officials attempted an unsuccessful military coup. The coup leaders were convicted and executed, including several senior officers in the army and some senior government officials.

On 19 April 1971, parliament declared Sierra Leone a republic, with Siaka Stevens as president and Sorie Ibrahim Koroma as Vice President. Under the APC regimes headed by Stevens, the Limba, Stevens' own ethnic group and the Creoles, enjoyed strong influence in the government and civil service. Another major ethnic group, the Temne joined the Mende in opposition to the APC government. But after Stevens appointed an ethnic Temne, Sorie Ibrahim Koroma as vice-president, the Temne appeared to have emerged as an influential group in the APC government. Guinean troops requested by Stevens to support his government were in the country from 1971 to 1973. In May 1973, general elections were held throughout the country, but the main opposition, the SLPP, boycotted the 1973 general election, alleging widespread intimidation and procedural obstruction.

In 1973, president Stevens and president William Tolbert of Liberia signed a treaty forming the Mano River Union to facilitate trade between Sierra Leone and Liberia, with Guinea joining in 1980 under president Sekou Toure. In 1975, Sierra Leone joined the Economic Community of West African States (ECOWAS).

An alleged plot to overthrow president Stevens failed in 1974 and its leaders were executed. In March 1976, Stevens was elected without opposition for a second five-year term as president. On 19 July 1975, 14 senior army and government officials including Brigadier David Lansana, former cabinet minister Mohamed Sorie Forna, Brigadier General Ibrahim Bash Taqi and Lieutenant Habib Lansana Kamara were executed after being convicted for allegedly attempting a coup to topple president Stevens' government.

In early 1977, a major anti-government demonstration by students and youth occurred throughout the country against the APC government and deteriorating economic conditions. Police and the army put down the demonstration.

In the national parliamentary election of May 1977, the APC won 74 seats and the main opposition, the SLPP, won 15. The SLPP condemned the election, alleged widespread vote-rigging and voter intimidation. In 1978, the APC dominant parliament approved a new constitution making the country a one-party state. The 1978 referendum made the APC the only legal political party in Sierra Leone. This move lead to another major demonstration in many parts of the country  but again it was put down by the army and the police.

Stevens is generally criticised for dictatorial methods and government corruption, but reduced ethnic polarisation in government by incorporating members of various ethnic groups into his all-dominating APC government.

References

History of Sierra Leone
Sierra Leone